Hare  (also called  or royal hare) is a traditional French culinary dish. There are two interpretations of this dish that both have historic origins. One is a hare in a stew with garlic and shallots that includes red wine. The other includes meat stuffed with foie gras and truffles serves in slices and topped with red wine.

References 

National dishes
French cuisine
Rabbit dishes